Tamana (also Rotcher Island) is the smallest island in the Gilbert Islands. It is accessible both by boat and by air with Air Kiribati and Coral Sun Airways (once a week; Tamana Airport code: TMN). 1,054 people live in Tamana (2020 census).

Tamana is the second southernmost island in the Gilbert group and the smallest inhabited  island in Kiribati. Tamana is a reef island with no lagoon.

The Island Council is located at Bakaakaa, the central village of the island and this is also  where the rest of the Government facilities are located such as the CB radio for inter-island communication, the hardware store, and the fuel depot. The schools (Primary and JSS) and the  Medical facilities are also located in the same village.

Myths and legends
The name Tamana is understood to mean ‘his/her father’; although in some myths it is understood to mean ‘a stronghold or strong place, or original settlement’.

History

In 1606, Spanish explorers became the first Europeans to discover the island.

Tamana in September 1942 was the southernmost island touched by the Japanese occupation of the Gilbert Islands but Japanese troops did not occupy the atoll.

Tamana Post Office opened around 1915.

Notes

References

Exhibit: The Alfred Agate Collection: The United States Exploring Expedition, 1838-1842 from the Navy Art Gallery

Gilbert Islands
Islands of Kiribati
Coral islands